John Layton (born 1951) is a former English footballer and coach.

John Layton may also refer to:
John Layton Sr. (died 2000), English footballer, made 549 competitive appearances for Hereford, John Layton's father
Jack Layton (John Gilbert Leyton, 1950–2011), Canadian politician, leader of New Democratic Party in 2003–2011
John Layton (sport shooter) (1912–1989), American Olympic shooter
John Layton (MP) for Appleby (UK Parliament constituency) in 1571

See also
John Leyton (born 1935), English actor and singer